Million Dollar Neighbourhood is a Canadian documentary television series on the Oprah Winfrey Network. The series debuted on January 22, 2012.

Premise
For the show, a group of 100 families work to increase their total net worth by $1 million in 10 weeks. On each episode, the group awards one family $10,000. If the overall goal is reached, one individual wins $100,000.

Episodes

Season 1: 2012

Season 2: 2013

References

2012 Canadian television series debuts
2013 Canadian television series endings
English-language television shows
Television shows filmed in Vancouver
Television series by Force Four Entertainment
2010s Canadian reality television series